Ong-Bak: Muay Thai Warrior, also known in the United States as Ong-Bak: The Thai Warrior is a 2003 Thai martial arts film directed by Prachya Pinkaew, featured stunt choreography by Panna Rittikrai and starring Tony Jaa. Ong-Bak proved to be Jaa's breakout film, with the actor hailed internationally as the next major martial arts star. Jaa went on to star in Tom-Yum-Goong (called The Protector in the US and Warrior King in the UK) and directed and starred in two prequels to Ong-Bak: Ong-Bak 2 and Ong-Bak 3.

Plot 
In the village of Ban Nong Pradu in rural northeastern Thailand lies an ancient Buddha statue named Ong-Bak. The village falls in despair after thieves from Bangkok desecrate the statue and take the head with them. Ting, a villager extremely skilled in Muay Thai, volunteers to travel to Bangkok to recover the stolen head of Ong-Bak. His only lead is Don, a drug dealer who attempted to buy an amulet in Nong Pradu one day earlier.

Upon arriving in Bangkok with a bagful of money donated by his village, Ting meets up with his cousin Humlae, who has dyed his hair blond and begun calling himself "George". Humlae and his friend Muay Lek are street-bike racing hustlers who make a living out of conning yaba dealers. Reluctant to help Ting, Humlae steals Ting's money and bets all of it in an underground fighting tournament at a bar on Khaosan Road. Ting tracks down Humlae and gets his money back after stunning the crowd by knocking out the champion in the ring with one kick. His extraordinary skill grabs the attention of Komtuan, a grey-haired crime lord who uses a wheelchair and needs an electrolarynx to speak. It is discovered that Don had stolen Ong-Bak's head to sell to Komtuan, who sees no value in it and orders him to dispose of it.

The next day, Humlae and Muay Lek are chased all over town by drug dealer Peng and his gang after a botched baccarat game scam at an illegal street gambling booth. Ting fights off most of the thugs and helps Humlae and Muay Lek escape in exchange for helping him find Don. They return to the bar, where Ting wins the respect of the crowd after defeating three opponents consecutively. The trio find Don's hideout, triggering a lengthy tuk-tuk chase. The chase ends at a port in the Chao Phraya River, where Ting discovers Komtuan's cache of stolen Buddha statues submerged underwater.

After the statues are recovered by local police, Komtuan sends his thugs to kidnap Muay Lek and tells Humlae to ask Ting to fight his bodyguard Saming near the Thai-Burmese border in exchange for Muay Lek and the Ong-Bak head. Ting is forced to throw the match against the drug-enhanced Saming, and Humlae throws in the towel. After the fight, Komtuan reneges on his promise to release Muay Lek and return the head, and he orders his henchmen to kill the trio. Ting and Humlae subdue the thugs and head to a mountain cave, where Komtuan's men are cutting a giant Buddha statue. Ting defeats the remaining thugs and Saming, but is shot by Komtuan. Before the crime lord attempts to destroy the Ong-Bak head with a sledgehammer, Humlae jumps to protect it, taking the brunt of the hammer blows. The giant Buddha statue head suddenly falls, crushing Komtuan to death and critically injuring Humlae. Humlae gives Ting the Ong-Bak head, and with his dying breath, asks him to look after Muay Lek and make sure she graduates from college.

The head of Ong-Bak is restored in Ban Nong Pradu. Humlae's ashes, carried by an ordained monk, arrives into the village in a procession on an elephant's back while the villagers and Muay Lek celebrate the return of Ong Bak's head.

Cast
 Tony Jaa as Ting from Ban Nong Pradu Village
 Petchtai Wongkamlao as George/Humlae (as Mum Jokemok in ending credits)
 Pumwaree Yodkamol as Muay Lek
 Chattapong Pantana-Angkul as Saming Sibtid
 Suchao Pongwilai as Komtuan (as Suchoa Pongvilai in ending credits)
 Wannakit Sirioput as Don (Komtuan's henchman) (as Wannakit Siriput in ending credits)
 Chumphorn Thepphithak as Uncle Mao (as Chumporn Teppitak in ending credits)
 Rungrawee Barijindakul as Ngek (as Rungrawee Borrijindakul in ending credits)
 Cheathavuth Watcharakhun as Peng (as Chetwut Wacharakun in ending credits)
 Somjal Jonmoontee as Bodyguard 1 (as Somjai Gunmoontree in ending credits)
 Somchai Moonma as Bodyguard 2
 Taworn Tonapan as Bodyguard 3
 Dan Chupong as Bodyguard 4 (as Chupong Changprung in ending credits)
 Chaiporn Gunmoontree as Bodyguard 5
 Don Ferguson as Bodyguard 6
 Panna Rittikrai as Nong Pradu Villager (uncredited)

Club fighters:
 David Ismalone as Mad Dog
 Hans Eric as Pearl Harbour
 Paul Gaius as Lee
 Nick Kara as Big Bear
 Nudhapol Asavabhakhin as Toshiro
 Taweesin Visanuyothin as Doctor Sak

Production
Ong-Bak introduced international audiences to a traditional form of muay Thai (or Muay Boran, an ancient muay Thai style), a kickboxing style that is known for violent strikes with fists, feet, shins, elbows, and knees. The fights were choreographed by Panna Rittikrai, who was also Tony Jaa's mentor and a veteran director of B-movie action films.

Jaa, who was trained in Muay Thai since childhood, wanted to make the film in order to bring Muay Thai to the mainstream. He and Panna struggled to raise money to produce a demo reel to drum up interest for the making of the film. Their first reel was made on expired film stock, so they had to raise more money and start over.

During the foot chase through the alleys, there is writing on a shop house door that reads "Hi Speilberg, let do it together" [sic]. This refers to the director's desire to someday work with Steven Spielberg. During the tuk-tuk chase, a pillar on the left side of the screen reads: "Hi, Luc Besson, we are waiting for you". The French producer-director's company, EuropaCorp, would go on to purchase the international distribution rights to the film.

Alternate versions
After Ong-Bak became a hit in Thailand, sales rights for outside Asia were purchased by Luc Besson's EuropaCorp, which in turn re-edited the film. Most of the subplot involving Muay Lek's sister, Ngek, was removed, and the final showdown between Ting and Saming was shortened. EuropaCorp also re-scored the soundtrack with some hip-hop sounds, replacing the Thai rock score; this is this version that has been made available in the United States and most of the Western world.

For the United Kingdom release, the soundtrack was scored yet again, this time with an orchestral score, but the film was left uncut with the subplot of Ngek.

The Hong Kong cut of the film's theatrical release omits a "bone breaking" sequence toward the end, where George's arm is snapped and Ting in turn snaps the leg of a bad guy. DVD releases in Hong Kong have the scene restored.

An alternative ending offered on the Thai, U.S., Australian, and UK DVD releases has Humlae surviving. He is seen at the end bandaged up, limping, with his arm broken, supported by his parents. Prachya Pinkaew stated in an interview that although there was debate, they ultimately decided it would be appropriate for him to make a meaningful sacrifice for the village.

Alternate titles
 In Thailand, Germany and in France, it was simply called Ong-Bak. This name was also preserved in Premier Asia's UK release.
 For the release in Singapore, Australia and other territories, as well as film festivals, the film was released as Ong-Bak: Muay Thai Warrior.
 In the United States, Canada and other areas, the film was released as Ong-Bak: The Thai Warrior.
 The Hong Kong English title was Thai Fist.
 In Italy, the title was Ong-Bak: Nato per Combattere, which translates as Ong-Bak: Born to Fight.
 In India, the title was Enter the New Dragon in reference to Bruce Lee.
 In Mexico, the title was Ong-Bak: El Nuevo Dragón, which translates as Ong-Bak: The New Dragon, in reference to Bruce Lee.
 In Vietnam, the title was Ong-Bak: The Hunt of the Statue of Buddha (Ong-Bak: Truy tìm tượng Phật).
 In Brazil, the title was Ong-Bak: Sacred Warrior ("Ong-Bak: Guerreiro Sagrado").

Home media
Ong-Bak: The Thai Warrior was released in the U.S. on DVD by Magnolia Pictures on August 30, 2005 and on Blu-ray Disc by 20th Century Fox on February 2, 2010.

Box office and reception
Ong-Bak premiered as the closing film of the 2003 Bangkok International Film Festival, and then opened in a wide release in Thailand cinemas in February 2003. On February 11, 2005, the film was released in North America in 387 theatres under the title Ong-Bak: The Thai Warrior.  In its opening weekend, it grossed US$1,334,869 ($3,449 per screen), on its way to a US total of $4,563,167.

The film was lauded for its action, in particular the fight scenes, which are emphasized over its storyline or characters. Its onrush of chase scenes, hand-to-hand combat and acrobatics,

The fight choreography drew notice for its quality, the inventiveness of the moves and lack of CGI and wire-fu. The film holds an 85% rating on Rotten Tomatoes based on 109 reviews, with the consensus being: "While Ong-Bak: The Thai Warrior may be no great shakes as a movie, critics are hailing the emergence of a new star in Tony Jaa, whose athletic performance is drawing comparisons with Bruce Lee, Jackie Chan, and Jet Li". On Metacritic it has a score of 69% based on reviews from 28 critics, indicating "generally favorable reviews".

Combat sports and striking analyst Jack Slack stated that Ong-Bak "is perhaps the finest martial arts movie of this generation".

Prequels
After Ong-Bak became a huge worldwide hit, Jaa's name was attached to many projects. He went on to act in a small role in the Petchtai Wongkamlao vehicle, The Bodyguard (co-directed by Panna Rittikrai), and then starred in the much-anticipated Tom-Yum-Goong in 2005. Ong Bak 2, a prequel to the original film, was released in December 2008, with Jaa debuting as director.

A second prequel, Ong Bak 3, followed where the second film left off.

See also

 List of martial arts films

References
Notes

Bibliography
 Yusof, Zack (November 21, 2003). "Selling a Thai style", The Star (Malaysia). (Retrieved from the Wayback Machine on April 19, 2020)
 Franklin, Erika (May 2005). "Alive and Kicking: Tony Jaa interviewed", Firecracker Media.

External links
 
 
 
 Ong-Bak at the Thai Film Database
 Ong-Bak review at cityonfire.com

Ong-Bak
Sahamongkol Film International films
Thai-language films
2003 action thriller films
Films set in Bangkok
Films set in Thailand
Films shot in Bangkok
Films shot in Thailand
Ong-Bak
Muay Thai films
Thai Muay Thai films
Thai martial arts films
Thai action films
Underground fighting films
Films directed by Prachya Pinkaew
Thai national heritage films
Ong Bak films
EuropaCorp films